The Ratification Act of 1929 (Pub. Res. 70–89, enacted 20 February 1929, codified at ) was joint resolution of the United States Congress that authorized the ratification of the Treaty of Cession of Tutuila of 1900 and the Treaty of Cession of Manu'a of 1904, which ceded the islands of Tutuila and Manu'a, respectively, to the United States and now form part of American Samoa. As such it is one of the basic Constitutional documents of American Samoa. These agreements came about because of the Second Samoan Civil War and the Tripartite Convention of 1899 between the United States, the United Kingdom, and the German Empire.

It provided that until the Congress provided for the Government of the islands of American Samoa all civil, judicial, and military powers would be exercised at the direction of the President of the United States. In  of 3 July 1951, the President of the United States directed that the Secretary of the Interior should take care for the administration of civil government in American Samoa. The Secretary promulgated the Constitution of American Samoa which was approved by a Constitutional Convention of the people of American Samoa and a majority of the voters of American Samoa voting at the 1966 election, and came into effect in 1967.

See also 
 History of American Samoa

1929 in American law
1929 in American Samoa
70th United States Congress
Politics of American Samoa
History of American Samoa
American Samoa law